This is a list of airlines of Mexico. The airline industry in Mexico began in 1921 with Compañía Mexicana de Transportación Aérea in Mexico City. Later known as Mexicana, it was the world's 4th oldest airline, and ceased operations on August 28, 2010.

Aeroméxico is currently Mexico's largest airline.

List

Interjet has ceased all operations and is defunct as of December 2020.

See also

List of airports in Mexico
List of defunct airlines of Mexico
Oneworld - Mexicana alliance
SkyTeam - Aeroméxico alliance

References

External links

Mexico
Airlines
Airlines
Mexico